Biology & Philosophy is a peer-reviewed academic journal that publishes articles about philosophy of biology, broadly understood to span conceptual, theoretical, and methodological issues in the biological sciences. 

The journal was founded by Michael Ruse in 1986, edited by him from 1986 to 2000, then edited by Kim Sterelny from 2000 to 2016, and it is currently edited by Michael Weisberg. It is published by Springer.

Abstracting and indexing
The journal is abstracted and indexed in the following databases

According to the Journal Citation Reports, the journal has a 2020 impact factor of 1.461.

References 

Philosophy of science journals
Philosophy of biology
Publications established in 1986
Springer Science+Business Media academic journals
English-language journals
Bimonthly journals